Ján Režňák (14 April 1919 in Jablonica, Czechoslovakia – 19 September 2007 in Martin, Slovakia) was the top Slovak fighter ace in the Slovak Air Force during the Second World War. He accumulated 32 kills on the Eastern Front against the Soviet Union.

References

1919 births
2007 deaths
Slovak military personnel of World War II
World War II flying aces
Recipients of the Gold German Cross
Recipients of the Iron Cross (1939), 1st class
Recipients of the Iron Cross (1939), 2nd class
Czechoslovak people